Clorinda Airport is a public use airport located  south-southwest of Clorinda, Formosa, Argentina.

See also
List of airports in Argentina

References

External links 
 Airport record for Clorinda Airport at Landings.com

Airports in Formosa Province
Formosa Province